The men's 160 + 320 + 480 + 640 medley relay event at the 1966 European Indoor Games was held on 27 March in Dortmund. The first athlete ran one lap of the 160-metre track, the second two, the third three and the anchor four, which gave in total 10 laps or 1600 metres.

Results

References

4 × 400 metres relay at the European Athletics Indoor Championships
Relay